The term "National Treasure" has been used in Japan to denote cultural properties since 1897.
The definition and the criteria have changed since the introduction of the term. These ancient documents adhere to the current definition, and have been designated National Treasures since the Law for the Protection of Cultural Properties came into effect on June 9, 1951. The items are selected by the Agency for Cultural Affairs, a special body of the Ministry of Education, Culture, Sports, Science and Technology, based on their "especially high historical or artistic value". "Ancient documents" is one of thirteen categories of National Treasures recognized by the agency. The list presents 62 documents or sets of documents from classical to early modern Japan, from the Asuka period to the Meiji period. The actual number of items is more than 62 because groups of related objects have been combined into single entries. The list contains items of various type such as letters, diaries, records or catalogues, certificates, imperial decrees, testaments and maps. The documents record early Japanese government and Buddhism including early Japanese contact with China, the organization of the state and life at the Japanese imperial court. They are housed in 14 Japanese cities in temples (35), museums (13), libraries or archives (6), shrines (4), universities (2) and in private collections (2). Most entries (28) in the list are located in Kyoto. The documents in this list were made predominantly with a writing brush on paper and, in many cases, present important examples of calligraphy.

Writing was physically introduced to Japan from China in the form of inscribed artefacts at the beginning of the Christian era. Examples, some of which have been designated as archaeological National Treasures, include coins of the reign of Wang Mang (AD 8–25), a 1st-century gold seal from Shikanoshima, a late 2nd century iron sword from the Tōdaijiyama burial mound, the Seven-Branched Sword with inscription from 369 and a large number of bronze mirrors—the oldest dating to the 3rd century. All of these artefacts originated on the continent, most likely in China. However, the written inscriptions on them may not have been recognized as writing but instead may have been mistaken for decorations by the Japanese. When the Japanese later manufactured locally copies of original Chinese mirrors, they may have continued to believe the written inscriptions to be merely decorative.

The concept of writing came to Japan from the Korean kingdom of Baekje in the form of classical Chinese books likely written on paper and in the form of manuscript rolls (kansubon). This probably happened at the beginning of the 5th century (around 400), and certainly during the 6th century. According to legend the scholar Wani introduced the Chinese writing system as well as Confucianism to Japan. The oldest texts of Japanese origin, which show a clear understanding of the concept of writing, date to the 5th century and are—like most texts from before 700—inscriptions on stone or metal.
Examples include three archaeological National Treasures: Suda Hachiman Shrine Mirror from about the 5th century, which is a poor copy of a Chinese original, the Inariyama Sword from 471 or 531 and the Eta Funayama burial mound sword from about the 5th century. The abrupt transition from an unfamiliarity with writing to reading and writing complicated works in a foreign language required the earliest Japanese texts be composed and read by people from the continent such as Wani. The Inariyama Sword is also the oldest example of man'yōgana use, a writing system that employs Chinese characters to represent the Japanese language. Soon after the introduction of writing, scribes were appointed to the provinces to "record events and report conditions".

While writing in Japan was limited during the 5th and 6th centuries, the number of documents written locally increased in the 7th century; though most of them have been lost. By the end of the 7th century increased cultural dependence on China caused reading and writing, particularly in government and religion, to become an integral part of Japanese life. There were two major factors for this development: starting with the Taika Reforms (645–649) and continuing with the Asuka Kiyomihara Code (689) and censuses from 670 and 690, a Chinese style centralised state was formed, requiring the need for a large number of officials who were literate and educated in, among others, Confucian texts at the Daigakuryo ("University") founded under Emperor Tenchi. The second factor was the increasing popularity of Buddhism, which had been introduced to Japan in the mid-6th century and strongly promoted by Prince Shōtoku (574–622). The Sangyō Gisho ("Annotated Commentaries on the Three Sutras"), traditionally attributed to Prince Shōtoku, is the oldest extant Japanese text of any length. Buddhism required the study of sutras written in Chinese and the state founded a Sutra Copying Bureau (shakyōjo) before 727. The oldest Japanese books are two chronicles, Kojiki and Nihon Shoki, from the early 8th century. While the phonogram orthography enjoyed increasing popularity during the 8th century, it was not yet used for longer prose. The modern kana, notably hiragana and katakana were developed in the Heian period.

Statistics
Almost half of all entries in the list are located in Kyoto.

Usage
The table's columns (except for Content and Images) are sortable pressing the arrows symbols. The following gives an overview of what is included in the table and how the sorting works.
Name: the name as registered in the Database of National Cultural Properties
Author: name of the author(s)
Content: information about the type of document and its content
Date: period and year; The column entries sort by year. If only a period is known, they sort by the start year of that period.
Format: principal type, technique and dimensions; The column entries sort by the main type: scroll (includes handscrolls and letters), collection (sets of items) and other (includes textiles, hanging scrolls, stone inscriptions and folding books 帖)
Present location: "building-name temple/museum/shrine-name town-name prefecture-name"; The column entries sort as "prefecture-name town-name".
Image: picture of the document or of a characteristic document in a group of documents

Treasures

See also
Nara Research Institute for Cultural Properties
Tokyo Research Institute for Cultural Properties
Independent Administrative Institution National Museum

Notes

References

Bibliography

Documents, Ancient
Documents

ja:日本の国宝一覧#古文書の部